Jersey competed at the 2011 Commonwealth Youth Games in Isle of Man from 7 to 13 September 2011. The Commonwealth Games Association of Jersey selected 7 competitors. They finished eighteenth in the medal table.

References

Nations at the 2011 Commonwealth Youth Games
2011 in Jersey